Squaring may refer to:

Square (algebra), the result of multiplying something by itself
Quadrature (mathematics), the process of determining the area of a plane figure